Hugh Morton (28 June 1903 – 11 July 1984) was an English actor, best known for his work on BBC Radio for which he made more than 3,000 broadcasts, beginning in the 1920s. His career spanned more than sixty years and also included theatre, cinema and television.

Life and career

Morton was born in Ivybridge, Devon, the son of a naval officer. The family was from the upper classes; its members included Morton's first cousin, Anthony Eden, who became British prime minister in the 1950s. Morton was educated at Haileybury and Queens' College, Cambridge, studied at the Royal Academy of Dramatic Art, and secured his first professional engagement in a touring company run by Violet and Irene Vanbrugh.

According to Morton's obituary in The Times, his cinema career began in the days of silent films. He was frequently cast in supporting roles as judges, bank managers or butlers. On stage he took over the role of Captain Hook in Peter Pan from Alastair Sim and appeared with Arthur Askey in a long-running comedy, The Love Racket. On radio he was the first actor to play the title role in the long-running Paul Temple series, and a regular member of the team of It's That Man Again, Life with the Lyons and Hancock's Half Hour. In these and other programmes he made more than 3,000 broadcasts. Character rôles on television included the Bishop in the 1978 Wodehouse Playhouse episode 'The Smile that Wins'.

Morton married the broadcaster Monica Strachey in 1938. He died in London at the age of 81.

Filmography

Notes

External links

1903 births
1984 deaths
20th-century English male actors
Male actors from Devon
Alumni of Queens' College, Cambridge
English male stage actors
English male film actors
English male television actors
English male radio actors